Bleadon Hill is a 13.52 hectare geological Site of Special Scientific Interest just north of  the village of Bleadon, North Somerset, notified in 1999.

The site is a Geological Conservation Review site, as it shows a low ridge of calcite-cemented Pleistocene sand and gravel on its southern side. Various marine or glacial origins have been postulated for the sediments and it has even been
suggested that this is a Mesozoic beach conglomerate.  On the basis of the sedimentology, it is most likely that these sediments accumulated during the Quaternary when an ice sheet rested against Bleadon Hill.

There is evidence or agricultural use of the land in the medieval period and possibly from Roman times.

References 

Hills of Somerset
History of Somerset
Sites of Special Scientific Interest in North Somerset
Sites of Special Scientific Interest notified in 1999